Bertrand Boissonnault (10 January 1907 – 30 September 1995) was a Canadian fencer. He competed in the team foil and individual épée events at the 1936 Summer Olympics.

References

1907 births
1995 deaths
Canadian male fencers
Olympic fencers of Canada
Fencers at the 1936 Summer Olympics
Fencers from Montreal
French Quebecers